William W. Wick (February 23, 1796 – May 19, 1868) was a U.S. Representative from Indiana and Secretary of State of Indiana. He was a lawyer and over his career he was a judge for 15 years. President Franklin Pierce appointed him Postmaster of Indianapolis, Indiana.

Wick proposed an amendment to extend the Missouri Compromise line west to the Pacific coast with the Wilmot Proviso (1846). The provision that would make slave states of the American southwest was passed in the House, but defeated in the Senate. Wick supported the colonization of blacks to Liberia. He campaigned for Stephen A. Douglas in 1860.

Early life and education
William Watson Wick was born on February 23, 1796, in Canonsburg, Washington County, Pennsylvania. He was the son of the Presbyterian Minister Rev. William Wick, Sr. and his wife Elizabeth McFarland.

In 1800, his parents moved the family to the Connecticut Western Reserve for the purpose of missionary work in the region; his father became the first minister to settle in the Western Reserve.

William completed preparatory studies, and after his father's death in 1815, he moved to Cincinnati, Ohio, where he taught school and studied medicine until 1818. He then studied law and was admitted to the bar at Franklin, Indiana, in 1819.

Career
After practicing law in Connersville, Indiana, Wick served as Clerk of the Indiana House of Representatives in 1820 and Assistant Clerk for the Indiana Senate in 1821. Appointed to a state judgeship, he served as President Judge of the Fifth Judicial Circuit from 1822 to 1825, presiding over the first court in Morgan County, Indiana. He moved to Indianapolis in 1822. He was the Quartermaster General in 1826.

He was then Indiana's Secretary of State until 1829. He returned to the Fifth Judicial Circuit, first as a Prosecutor until 1831, and from 1834 to 1837 he was again a President Judge. He presided over the trial about the Fall Creek massacre, which resulted in the first recorded case of a white man being sentenced to death for crimes against Native Americans.

In 1838, Wick was elected to the Twenty-sixth Congress as a Democrat, and began his first term in March 4, 1839. Having failed in his bid for reelection, he resumed his private law practice in Indianapolis.

He was elected to the Twenty-ninth and Thirtieth Congress, and served from March 4, 1845 to March 3, 1849. In 1846, during the debates about the Wilmot Proviso, he proposed an amendment to extend the Missouri Compromise line to the Pacific coast. Wick feared that free blacks would flood the urban northeast. The proposal was defeated 89–54. The Wilmot Proviso passed the House and was defeated in the Senate.

Wick was a leading opponent of racial mixing and integration, and famous for his opposition to the annexation of Mexican territory.  He stated: "I do not want any mixed races in our Union, nor men of any color except white, unless they be slaves. Certainly not as voters or legislators." He also served as Secretary of the Indiana Colonization Society (affiliated with the American Colonization Society), which helped to establish Liberia as a homeland for free blacks.

He sat as a judge of the Circuit Court for a third time from 1850 to 1853. In 1853, President Franklin Pierce appointed him Postmaster of Indianapolis, in which capacity he served until April 6, 1857. Later he served as Adjutant General in the State Militia. He moved to Franklin, Indiana, in 1857, where he continued his law practice. He sat as a judge of the Circuit Court for a fourth time until the Autumn of 1859, for a total of 15 years on the bench. In 1860, he supported Stephen A. Douglas's campaign for president by giving speeches throughout Indiana.

Personal life
Wick was married on August 20, 1820, to Laura or Lora Finch, the sister of the esteemed lawyer Fabius M, Finch, in Fayette County, Indiana. They had two sons and a daughter. His wife died in 1832. He married Isabella Graham Barbee (or Barber) on November 7, 1839, in Washington, Indiana. Isabella was the daughter of Alice Bickerton Winston and Thomas Barbee. The Wicks had a daughter, Alice Barbee Wick.

Around 1860, Wick moved to Franklin, Indiana, to live with his daughter, Laura W. Overstreet (Mrs. William H. Overstreet), who was born about 1824. The Overstreets had four children by 1850 and the same year 20-year-old Cyrus Wick lived with them. He died at his daughter's house in Franklin on May 19, 1868. He was interred in Greenlawn Cemetery. He was described as "warm-hearted, humorous and improvident… and he took no thought for the morrow." Isabella, his second wife, lived until 1875.

Notes

References

1796 births
1868 deaths
Indiana state court judges
People from Canonsburg, Pennsylvania
Secretaries of State of Indiana
Democratic Party members of the United States House of Representatives from Indiana
People from Franklin, Indiana
19th-century American politicians
19th-century American judges